2,2-Dimethylbutane, trivially known as neohexane, is an organic compound with formula C6H14 or (H3C-)3-C-CH2-CH3. It is therefore an alkane, indeed the most compact and  branched of the hexane isomers — the only one with a quaternary carbon and a butane (C4) backbone.

Synthesis 
2,2-Dimethylbutane can be synthesised by the hydroisomerisation of 2,3-dimethylbutane using an acid catalyst.

It can also be synthesised by isomerization of n-pentane in the presence of a catalyst containing combinations of one or more of palladium, platinum, rhodium and rhenium on a matrix of zeolite, alumina, silicon dioxide or other materials. Such reactions create a mixture of final products including isopentane, n-hexane, 3-methylpentane, 2-methylpentane, 2,3-dimethylbutane and 2,2-dimethylbutane. Since the composition of the final mixture is temperature dependant the desired final component can be obtained choice of catalyst and by combinations of temperature control and distillations.

Uses 
Neohexane is used as an additive in fuels and in the manufacture of agricultural chemicals. It is also used in a number of commercial, automobile and home maintenance products, such as adhesives, electronic contact cleaners and upholstery polish sprays.

In laboratory settings, it is commonly used as a probe molecule in techniques which study the active sites of metal catalysts. Such catalysts are used in hydrogen-deuterium exchange, hydrogenolysis, and isomerization reactions. It is well suited to this purpose as 2,2-dimethylbutane contains both an isobutyl and an ethyl group.

See also
Methylbutane (isopentane)
2-Methylpentane (isohexane)

References

Alkanes